USS Thunder was a blockade running steamer captured  by the Union Navy during the American Civil War.

Service history
Thunder was purchased by the Union Navy at the prize court and outfitted her as a ship's tender used to support Union ships in the South Atlantic blockade of the Confederate States of America. Renamed Thunder, the sloop joined the South Atlantic Blockading Squadron for use as a ship’s tender. During October 1864, she operated off Wassaw Sound, Georgia, and returned to Port Royal, South Carolina, in November for repairs. Thunder serviced blockade vessels off the Savannah River, Georgia, in January and February 1865 and spent most of the remaining months of the war on duty off Tybee Island, South Carolina. Thunder was sold at Port Royal on 8 August 1865 to John Smith.

See also

Blockade runners of the American Civil War
Blockade mail of the Confederacy

References 

Ships of the Union Navy
Sloops of the United States Navy
Tenders of the United States Navy
American Civil War auxiliary ships of the United States